Sipe Springs may refer to:
Sipe Springs, Comanche County, Texas
Sipe Springs, Milam County, Texas